Ambattur taluk is a taluk of Chennai district of the Indian state of Tamil Nadu. Its headquarters are the neighbourhood of Ambattur. This taluk was created from a division of Ponneri taluk, Tiruvallur district. On 4 January 2018, Chennai district was expanded by annexing Ambattur taluk. The RTO code for Ambattur taluk is TN-13.
The revenue villages in Ambattur taluk are :
Ambattur
Athipet
Karukku
Kallikuppam
Pudur
Korattur 
Menambedu 
Anna Nagar West extension
Mogappair 
Oragadam 
Padi 
Pattravakkam.

Demographics
According to the 2011 census, the taluk of Ambattur had a population of 924,474 out of which 469,137 are males and 455,337 are females. There were 971 women for every 1,000 men. The taluk had a literacy rate of 81.9%. Child population in the age group below 6 years were 45,980 males and 43,831 females.

References 

Taluks of Chennai district